Rahi Masoom Reza (September 1927 – 15 March 1992) was an Indian Urdu and Hindi poet and writer and a Bollywood lyricist. He won the Filmfare Best Dialogue Award for the film Main Tulsi Tere Aangan Ki in 1979, followed by Mili and Lamhe.

Biography

Early life and education
Reza was born in a Muslim family in a village named Gangauli, located in Ghazipur district of Uttar Pradesh, one of the most populous states in Northern India. He was the younger brother of educationist Moonis Raza and scholar Mehdi Raza.

Raza completed his early education in and around Ghazipur, from where he went to Aligarh Muslim University to complete higher studies. His studies and life revolved around Muslim theology. He completed a doctorate in Hindustani Literature and pursued a career in literature. He wrote novels under the pseudonym, Shahid Akhtar, for an Urdu magazine Rumani Duniya from Allahabad. He then went on to become a Lecturer in Urdu at Aligarh Muslim University before moving to Bombay (now Mumbai).

Literary career
He wrote the script and dialogues for a TV serial, Mahabharat. The TV serial was based on the epic, the Mahabharata. The serial became a popular TV serial in India, with a peak television rating of around 86%.

Works

His works include:

Novels
 Adha Gaon (The Divided Village)
 Dil Ek Saada Kaghaz
 Topi Shukla
 Os Ki Boond
 Katra Bi Arzoo
 Scene No. 75
Poetry
 Mauz-e-ghul mauz-e-saba (Urdu)
 Ajnabee shahar: ajnabee raste (Urdu)
 Main ek Feriwala (Hindi)
 Sheeshe ke Makaan Wale (Hindi)
 Autobiography
 Chotey aadmi ki badee kahaani ("Big Story of a Small Man")
Movie and TV scripts
 Neem ka Ped – novel and TV serial of the same name
 Kissi Se Na Kehna
 Main Tulsi Tere Aangan Ki
 Disco Dancer (1982)
 Mahabharat (1988)
Movie dialogues
 Alaap (1977)
 Gol Maal (1979)
 Karz (1980)
 Judaai (1980)
 Hum Paanch (1980)
 Anokha Rishta (1986)
 Baat Ban Jaye (1986)
 Naache Mayuri (1986)
 Awam (1987)
 Lamhe (1991)
 Parampara (1992)
 Aaina (1993)
Movie Lyrics
 Alaap (1977)
 Des Mein Nikla Hoga Chand (Jagjit Singh & Chitra Singh)

References

External links

A Village Divided 

Indian male novelists
Hindi-language poets
Hindi-language writers
20th-century Indian Muslims
Aligarh Muslim University alumni
People from Ghazipur
Filmfare Awards winners
1992 deaths
1927 births
Indian male screenwriters
20th-century Indian novelists
20th-century Indian poets
Indian male poets
People from Ghazipur district
Poets from Uttar Pradesh
Hindi screenwriters
20th-century Indian dramatists and playwrights
Screenwriters from Uttar Pradesh
Novelists from Uttar Pradesh
20th-century Indian male writers
Urdu-language poets from India
20th-century Indian screenwriters